2016 Tipsport liga  is the eighteen edition of annual football tournament in Czech Republic.

Groups

Group A

Group B

Group C

Group D

Placement Playoffs

Semifinals

Third place

Final

External links
 Results

2016 in association football
Tipsport